Yeungnam Law School is one of the professional graduate schools of Yeungnam University, located in Kyoungsan, South Korea. Founded in 2009, it is one of the founding law schools in South Korea and is one of the medium size schools with each class in the three-year J.D. program having approximately 70 students.

Programs
Yeungnam Law specializes on the small and medium business law.

References

Website 
 Official Website

Yeungnam University
Law schools in South Korea
2009 establishments in South Korea
Educational institutions established in 2009
ko:영남대학교 법학전문대학원